Gurdon Buck (May 4, 1807 – March 6, 1877) was a pioneering military plastic surgeon during the Civil War.  He is known for being the first doctor to incorporate pre- and post-operative photographs into his publications.  Buck's fascia and Buck's extension are both named after him.

Biography

Education
Buck graduated from the Columbia University College of Physicians and Surgeons in 1830 and interned at New York Hospital.  He also studied in Paris, Berlin and Vienna.  He was appointed visiting surgeon to the New York Hospital in 1837 which he held the rest of his life.  He was also appointed to the New York Eye and Ear Infirmary.

Advances in medicine
In 1845, Buck took the first clinical photograph and used an engraving of it in "The Knee Joint Anchylosed at a Right Angle". This was the first known published illustration of a medical photograph.

Dr. Buck was a founding fellow of The New York Academy of Medicine in 1847.

He wrote Contributions to Reparative Surgery (New York, 1876) which is the first American plastic surgery textbook.

Death
He is buried in the New York Marble Cemetery.

References

Further reading
 Stanley Burns, "Early Medical Photography in America (1839–1883) IV. Early Wet-Plate Era". New York State Journal of Medicine. 79: 1937, 1979.

Publications
 Gurdon Buck, "The Knee-Joint Anchylosed at a Right Angle..." The American Journal of the Medical Sciences. N.S. 10: 277-284, 1845.
 Gurdon Buck, "New Treatment For Fractures of the Femur". Bulletin of the New York Academy of Medicine. 1: 181-188, 1860-1862.
 Gurdon Buck, "On the Surgical Treatment of Morbid Growths Within the Larynx". Transactions of the American Medical Association. 6: 509-535, 1853.
 Gurdon Buck, "Excision of the Elbow Joint in a Case of Suppuration and Caries of the Bones". (Paper delivered at the meeting of The New York Medical and Surgical Society, New York, N.Y., December 3, 1842), p. 1. 
 Gurdon Buck, "A New Feature in the Anatomical Structure of the Genito-Urinary Organs Not Hitherto Described". Transactions of the American Medical Association. 1: 367-371, 1848.

External links

 
 
Lecture at New York Academy of Medicine
Photograph

1807 births
1877 deaths
American Civil War surgeons
American plastic surgeons
Columbia University Vagelos College of Physicians and Surgeons alumni
Burials at New York Marble Cemetery